The Return from Fishing: Hauling the Boat, is an oil on canvas by the Spanish painter Joaquín Sorolla in 1894. Large in size (265 x 403.5 cm) it has been exhibited at the Musée d'Orsay since 1977. The painting depicts the return of a fishing boat with a lateen sail. Two oxen tow the boat on a beach surrounded by fishermen.

History
The canvas was acquired by the French State in 1895 at the Salon for 6000 francs. It was successively exhibited at the Musée du Luxembourg, the Louvre (1922), the Musée national d'art moderne (1946) until 1977 when it was attributed to the Louvre and since then exhibited at the Musée d'Orsay.

The painting has been exhibited internationally many times, including notably:

Salon de la Société des artistes français - palais des Champs Elysées - Paris, 1895
Joaquin Sorolla y Bastida - IBM Gallery of science and art - New York, 1989
Joaquin Sorolla y Bastida - The Saint Louis Gallery - Saint Louis, 1989
Joaquin Sorolla y Bastida - San Diego Museum of Art - San Diego, 1989
Joaquin Sorolla y Bastida - Institut Valencià d'Art Modern - Valencia, 1989 - 1990
Sargent-Sorolla - Fundación Caja Madrid - Madrid, 2006 - 2007
Sargent-Sorolla - Petit Palais - Musée des Beaux-Arts de la Ville de Paris - Paris, 2007
Joaquin Sorolla 1863-1923 - Museo Nacional del Prado - Madrid, 2009
L'Espagne entre deux siècles de Zuloaga à Picasso - musée de l'Orangerie - Paris, 2011 - 2012
Joaquín Sorolla. Spaniens Meister des Lichts - :de:Kunsthalle der Hypo-Kulturstiftung - Munich, 2016
Sorolla. Un peintre espagnol à Paris - :fr:Musée des Impressionnismes Giverny - Giverny, 2016
Sorolla: Spanish Master of Light - The National Gallery - London, 2019

Description
The scene takes place by the sea, when a fishing boat returns to El Cabañal beach, in Valencia. In the center of the composition, two oxen in the foreground pull a Catalan boat. The flapping sail is inflated by the wind and seems to help them. On the left in the foreground, a fisherman waits with a plank, probably the one on which the boat will be placed when the time comes. Another sailor is seated on the neck of one of the oxen which he seems to be guiding. In the background, in the shadows, another sailor is watching in the boat. Finally, in the background, in the light, a last fisherman in the boat adjusts a sheet so that the wind facilitates the maneuver.

The entire composition stands out against blue backgrounds (sea below, sky above). Sorolla brings out bursts of light from the chiaroscuros caused by the shadow of the sail.

Reception
The painting was a resounding success with city dwellers seduced by “its Mediterranean atmosphere [...] the manual work and liveliness”. The painter received the highest distinction awarded at the exhibition, and the canvas was purchased by the Musée du Luxembourg.

References

1894 paintings
Paintings in the collection of the Musée d'Orsay
Impressionist paintings
Paintings by Joaquín Sorolla
Maritime paintings